Gook Creek is a stream in Antrim County, Michigan, in the United States. It is a tributary of the Jordan River.

Although gook is used as a common ethnic slur, the creek's name possibly was taken from a Native American language.

See also
List of rivers of Michigan

References

Rivers of Antrim County, Michigan
Rivers of Michigan